Northern Sulphuric Soul is the debut studio album by English electronic music duo Rae & Christian, released on 5 October 1998 by Grand Central Records.

In the United States, Northern Sulphuric Soul was released on the Sm:)e label, with a green version of the original orange sleeve. A remastered version was released on 12 January 2004, which contained three extra tracks and alternative sleeve art.

Track listing

Personnel
Rae & Christian
 Steve Christian – engineering, mixing, production
 Mark Rae – production, scratching, liner notes

Charts

References

1998 debut albums
Rae & Christian albums
Grand Central Records albums